Contempt is a 1963 French New Wave drama film written and directed by Jean-Luc Godard, based on the 1954 Italian novel Il disprezzo (A Ghost at Noon) by Alberto Moravia. It stars Brigitte Bardot, Michel Piccoli, Jack Palance, and Giorgia Moll.

Plot
Paul Javal, a young French playwright who has found commercial success in Rome, accepts an offer from vulgar American producer Jeremy Prokosch to rework the script for German director Fritz Lang's screen adaptation of the Odyssey.

Paul's wife, Camille Javal, joins him on the first day of the project at Cinecittà. As the first discussions are completed, Prokosch invites the crew to join him at his villa, offering Camille a ride in his two-seat sportscar. Camille looks to Paul to decline the offer, but he submissively withdraws to follow by taxi, leaving Camille and Prokosch alone. Paul does not catch up with them until 30 minutes later, explaining that he was delayed by a traffic accident. Camille grows uneasy, secretly doubting his honesty and suspecting that he is using her to cement his ties with Prokosch. Her misgivings are heightened when she sees Paul grope Prokosch's secretary, Francesca. Back at their apartment, Paul and Camille discuss the subtle uneasiness that has come between them in the first few hours of the project, and Camille suddenly announces to her bewildered husband that she no longer loves him.

Hoping to rekindle Camille's love, Paul convinces her to accept Prokosch's invitation to join them for filming in Capri. Prokosch and Lang are locked in a conflict over the correct interpretation of Homer's work, an impasse exacerbated by the difficulty of communication between the German director, French script writer, and American producer. Francesca acts as interpreter, mediating all conversations. When Paul sides with Prokosch against Lang by suggesting that Odysseus actually left home because of his wife's infidelity, Camille's suspicions of her husband's servility are confirmed. She deliberately allows him to find her in Prokosch's embrace, and in the ensuing confrontation she implies that her respect for him has turned to contempt because he has bartered her to Prokosch. He denies this suggestion, offering to sever his connection with the film and leave Capri; but she will not recant and leaves for Rome with the producer. After a car crash in which Camille and Prokosch are killed, Paul prepares to leave Capri and return to the theater. Lang continues to work on the film.

Cast
 Brigitte Bardot as Camille Javal
 Michel Piccoli as Paul Javal
 Jack Palance as Jeremy Prokosch
 Giorgia Moll as Francesca Vanini
 Fritz Lang as himself
 Raoul Coutard as the cameraman
 Jean-Luc Godard as Lang's assistant director
 Linda Veras as a Siren

Production
Italian film producer Carlo Ponti approached Godard to discuss a possible collaboration; Godard suggested an adaptation of Moravia's novel Il disprezzo (originally translated into English with the title A Ghost at Noon) in which he saw Kim Novak and Frank Sinatra as the leads; they refused. Ponti suggested Sophia Loren and Marcello Mastroianni, whom Godard refused. Anna Karina (by then Godard's former wife) later revealed that the director had traveled to Rome to ask Monica Vitti if she would portray the female lead. However the Italian actress reportedly turned up an hour late, "staring out the window like she wasn't interested at all". Finally, Bardot was chosen because of the producer's insistence that the profits might be increased by displaying her famously sensual body. This provided the film's opening scene, filmed by Godard as a typical mockery of the cinema business with tame nudity. The scene was shot after Godard considered the film finished, at the insistence of the American co-producers. In the film, Godard cast himself as Lang's assistant director, and characteristically has Lang expound many of Godard's New Wave theories and opinions. Godard also employed the two "forgotten" New Wave filmmakers, Luc Moullet and Jacques Rozier, on the film. Bardot visibly reads a book about Fritz Lang that was written by Moullet, and Rozier made the documentary short about the making of the film Le Parti des Choses.

Godard admitted to changing the original novel, "but with full permission" of Moravia, the original writer. Among his changes were focusing the action to only a few days and changing the writer character from being "silly and soft. I've made him more American—something like a Humphrey Bogart type."

Filming
Contempt was filmed in Italy where it is set, with location shooting at the Cinecittà studios in Rome and the Casa Malaparte on Capri island. In a sequence, the characters played by Piccoli and Bardot wander through their apartment alternately arguing and reconciling. Godard filmed the scene as an extended series of tracking shots, in natural light and in near real-time. The cinematographer Raoul Coutard also shot some of the other nouvelle vague films, including Godard's Breathless (1960). According to Jonathan Rosenbaum, Godard was also directly influenced by Jean-Daniel Pollet and Volker Schlöndorff's Méditerranée, released earlier the same year.

Godard admitted his tendency to get actors to improvise dialogue "during the peak moment of creation" often baffled them. "They often feel useless," he said. "Yet they bring me a lot... I need them, just as I need the pulse and colours of real settings for atmosphere and creation."

Critical reception
On the review aggregator website Rotten Tomatoes, the film has an approval rating of 91% based on 58 reviews, with an average score of 8.6/10. The site's critical consensus reads: "This powerful work of essential cinema joins 'meta' with 'physique,' casting Brigitte Bardot and director Godard's inspiration Fritz Lang."

Sight & Sound critic Colin MacCabe referred to Contempt as "the greatest work of art produced in postwar Europe."

Bosley Crowther of The New York Times called the film "luxuriant" but wrote that Godard "could put his talents to more intelligent and illuminating use"; according to Crowther, who is unclear about the motivations of the main characters, "Mr. Godard has attempted to make this film communicate a sense of the alienation of individuals in this complex modern world. And he has clearly directed to get a tempo that suggests irritation and ennui."

Legacy
French journalist Antoine de Gaudemar made a one-hour documentary in 2009 about Contempt, Il était une fois... Le Mépris (A Film and Its Era: Contempt) using footage from Jacques Rozier's earlier documentaries Paparazzi (1963), Le Parti des Choses (1964), and André S. Labarthe's Le dinosaure et le bébé (1967).

In 2012, Godard's film ranked 21st on critic's poll and 44th on director's poll in Sight & Sound magazine's 100 greatest films of all time list.

The extended apartment sequence that occurs in the film, where Paul and Camille's marriage unravels, has been praised by critics and scholars. In February 2012, Interiors, an online journal that is concerned with the relationship between architecture and film, released an issue that discussed how space is used in this scene. The issue highlights how Jean-Luc Godard uses this constricted space to explore Paul and Camille's declining relationship.

The song "Theme de Camille", which was originally composed for Contempt, is used as a main theme in the 1995 film Casino.

A still from the film was used as the official poster for the 2016 Cannes Film Festival.

In 2018 the film ranked 60th on the BBC's list of the 100 greatest foreign-language films, as voted on by 209 film critics from 43 countries.

References

External links
 
 
 
 
 
 "Contempt: The Story of a Marriage", essay by Phillip Lopate at The Criterion Collection
 Raoul Coutard talks about the filming of Contempt from webofstories.com
 Rafferty on 40th anniversary from The New York Times (login required)

1963 films
1963 drama films
1960s satirical films
CinemaScope films
English-language French films
English-language Italian films
Films about film directors and producers
Films about screenwriters
Films based on Italian novels
Films based on works by Alberto Moravia
Films directed by Jean-Luc Godard
Films scored by Georges Delerue
Films scored by Piero Piccioni
Films set in Italy
Films shot in Italy
French drama films
1960s French-language films
French satirical films
1960s German-language films
Italian drama films
1960s Italian-language films
Italian satirical films
1960s multilingual films
French multilingual films
Italian multilingual films
1960s Italian films
1960s French films
German-language French films